

Gerd-Paul Valerian Georg Heinrich von Below (30 November 1892 – 8 December 1953) was a general in the Wehrmacht of Nazi Germany during World War II. He was a recipient of the Knight's Cross of the Iron Cross. Below surrendered to the Soviet troops in May 1945 and died in captivity in 1953.

Awards and decorations

 Knight's Cross of the Iron Cross on 28 February 1943 as Oberst of the Reserves and commander of the augmented Grenadier-Regiment 374

References

Citations

Bibliography

 

1892 births
1953 deaths
People from Vorpommern-Greifswald
People from the Province of Brandenburg
Gerd-Paul
Major generals of the German Army (Wehrmacht)
German Army personnel of World War I
Recipients of the clasp to the Iron Cross, 1st class
Recipients of the Knight's Cross of the Iron Cross
German prisoners of war in World War II held by the Soviet Union
German people who died in Soviet detention
Military personnel from Mecklenburg-Western Pomerania
German Army generals of World War II